Linda Zarda Cook (born June 4, 1958) is an American businesswoman. She rose to be CEO of Shell Gas & Power, part of Royal Dutch Shell, in the Netherlands. Cook was named the 11th most powerful businesswoman in the world by Fortune magazine in October 2002 and the 44th most powerful woman in the world by Forbes magazine in September 2007.

Biography
Cook, raised in Shawnee, Kansas, graduated from the University of Kansas in petroleum engineering in 1980. She began her Shell career in 1980 as a reservoir engineer in the United States, advancing through the company to accept greater responsibilities in exploration and production with Shell U.S.A. Her first European assignment came in 1998, when she and her family moved to the Netherlands, where she led Shell International EP. She has led the Gas & Power division since January 2000. Cook is also member of board of directors of KBR (company) and The Boeing Company.

Following a loss in the race to become the company's next Chief Executive, Cook is to step down from her position in Royal Dutch Shell, forgoing a loyalty bonus of more than £800,000. Shortly following the announcement of her resignation was the news that her division, Gas and Power, would be absorbed into the new management structure being promoted by new Chief Executive Peter Voser. Shares in Shell fell 1.1 per cent or 18p to 1613p in morning trading.

A Shell spokesman said the resignation was by mutual agreement.  Cook, who since 2004 has been in charge of the group’s gas and power division, responsible for natural gas, liquefied natural gas, and Shell’s power generation operations, had worked for Shell for 29 years.  Cook's severance pay comes to about 5.4 million euros, a figure determined by standard company and legal guidelines.

On March 16, 2015 it was announced that Cook would not seek reelection to Boeing's board of directors.

References

American women chief executives
University of Kansas alumni
Living people
1958 births
American corporate directors
Boeing people
People from Shawnee, Kansas
Petroleum engineers
American women engineers
Directors of Shell plc
21st-century women engineers
21st-century American businesswomen
21st-century American businesspeople